Neela Marikkar is the Chairperson of Dentsu Grant Group (formally Grant McCann Erickson), a leading Communications Group in Sri Lanka in partnership with Dentsu and Dentsu Aegis Network.

Biography

Neela is a daughter of the Sri Lankan media personality Reggie Candappa and wife Therese Candappa.

Peace activist

Neela has served as Chairperson of various institutions in the business sector including the Committee on Communication and Social Mobilization of the National Advisory Council for Peace and Reconciliation in Sri Lanka.

She is the president of Sri Lanka First, an influential group of corporate leaders who promote a peaceful settlement by negotiation between the Government of Sri Lanka and the Liberation Tigers of Tamil Eelam.

Consultant to UNDP

Neela was a consultant to UNDP’s Invest-in-peace Program to help revive the country’s war affected economy. She led a group of Sri Lankan Business leaders to South Africa to study the role business played in their peace process and post conflict reconstruction.

Women activist

Neela served in the Women Waging Peace Network and at their Colloquium, she was invited to be a speaker on the role of women in peace building at the John F. Kennedy School of Government, Harvard University.

References

External links
 Profile of Neela Marikkar
 Neela Marikkar
 Promoting Peace in Sri Lanka
 Neela_family
 SJMS Quarterly
 SriLankaFirst calls for vote on peace
 REGINALD (REGGIE) SEBASTIAN RODRIGO CANDAPPA
 Dentsu Grant Group
 WE ARE PLANNING THE NEXT WAVE

Sri Lankan humanitarians
Living people
Sri Lankan Chetty businesspeople
Sri Lankan public relations people
Sri Lankan women in business
Sri Lankan activists
Sri Lankan women activists
Year of birth missing (living people)
Sri Lankan businesspeople